Numidum  is a Gram-positive and facultative anaerobic genus of bacteria from the family of Bacillaceae with one known species (Numidum massiliense) which has been isolated from the human gut.

References

Bacillaceae
Bacteria genera
Monotypic bacteria genera
Bacteria described in 2016